Down in the Valley is a 2005 American neo-western film starring Edward Norton, Evan Rachel Wood, David Morse and Rory Culkin. The film made its debut in the Un Certain Regard section at the 2005 Cannes Film Festival on May 13, and made its limited theatrical release in North America on May 5, 2006.

Plot
In the San Fernando Valley, rebellious teenager October "Tobe" takes a walk with her younger brother, Lonnie.  The next day, Tobe goes to the beach with friends, and when they stop for gasoline, they are assisted by Harlan, a young man who affects a folksy, cowboy style.  Tobe invites much-older Harlan to the beach.  He accepts, which results in his losing his job. At the beach, they kiss and, after returning to Harlan's house, they have sex.  He  takes her on a date, and the trio get something to eat. Later that night, they go on their "real" date, dancing and meeting up with Tobe's friends for another party, where Harlan takes drugs under the influence of Tobe. She returns home the next day; as she has returned home long after she was expected, Wade, her father, becomes enraged, and she retreats to her room. When she refuses to talk, he pounds on the door and leaves visible damage.

Tobe continues to see Harlan.  Her father's rage increases, and he shatters her bedroom window.  Tobe and Harlan ride a horse that supposedly belongs to one of Harlan's friends named Charlie.  Upon returning, Charlie claims he has never met Harlan and that the horse was stolen.  The couple are held in police custody until Wade comes to pick up Tobe.  She tells Harlan that they should no longer see each other.  Harlan, however, is persistent and takes Lonnie shooting without Wade's permission. Wade, who is armed, orders Harlan to leave his children alone.

Mentally unstable, Harlan is evicted from his apartment after shooting at his reflection in a mirror, imagining a Wild West-style "shoot-out".  After an awkward incident at a local synagogue, where he is abruptly ushered out, he breaks into what is presumably the house of his father or foster father, who is revealed to be a Hasidic Jew. He leaves the letter he has been narrating throughout the film after taking multiple Jewish memorabilia, and the contents of a box, in a closet, inscribed with his name. He breaks into Tobe's house and packs a bag so that they can run away.  When Tobe comes home to find him, she is dumbfounded, happy to see him at first. As she slowly realizes he is deranged, she tells him she does not want to leave her family and that he should go. As they argue, Harlan shoots her in the stomach.

When Tobe's father returns home to find Tobe alone on her bed, barely alive, he suspects Harlan, who has failed in an attempt at calling 9-1-1 and run away.  Wade rushes Tobe to the hospital, where she is attached to a breathing machine and remains in a coma.  Harlan, who is covered in Tobe's blood, then shoots himself in the side to conceal Tobe's blood and also make it look like it was Wade who had shot them. Harlan finds Lonnie and convinces him that it was really Wade who shot Tobe, and that Harlan was wounded while trying to stop him. Tobe regains consciousness at the hospital and Wade realizes that Harlan has taken Lonnie. At night while Harlan and Lonnie are by a fire, Wade, Charlie and a detective named Sheridan arrive. Harlan shoots Charlie before riding off with Lonnie.

They stumble upon a Western film set where shooting has just begun. Wade and Sheridan arrive with two more cops. During the shootout, Harlan guns down detective Sheridan and one of the cops.  Harlan and Lonnie escape to a construction site, where Wade finds them and another shootout ensues. Wade shoots Harlan to death to the horror of Lonnie.

Later, Wade drives Tobe and Lonnie to a place where Tobe and Harlan had a pleasant day. Tobe is holding a box that contains Harlan's ashes.  Her brother asks her what they should say about him. She replies, "Don't say anything, just think it," and scatters the ashes.

Cast

Writing
Writer David Jacobson was inspired to write this film by his childhood in the San Fernando Valley.  He commented that there was never much to do except throw things onto the highway (which possibly inspired a deleted scene from the film titled Don't Look), have dirt clod fights, and spending many hot summer days at the local cinema with friends, watching the same films over and over.  One favorite was Butch Cassidy and the Sundance Kid, which he watched seventeen times.  Jacobson also has noted that he and his sister were mild backgrounds for Tobe and Lonnie.
The script was written with loose scenes, and is considered by Jacobson himself to be some of his lighter work.

Critical reception
On the review aggregation website Rotten Tomatoes, the film holds a 52% approval rating, based on 101 reviews. The website's consensus reads, "The premise of Old West clashing with modern suburbia is fresh and initially intriguing, but the second act degenerates into a clumsy jumble of events which strain credibility."

American movie critic Roger Ebert expressed mixed feelings about the film in his review for the Chicago Sun-Times. On the one hand, he noted several qualities "that make me happy to have seen it", especially the nuanced acting performance of Edward Norton and the "peculiar loneliness" of his character Harlan. On the other hand, Ebert took issue with the film's ending which he found to be implausible and driven too much by the abstract idea behind the plot instead of the characters in it.

References

External links
 Official website (not active as of April 7, 2014)
 
 
 

2005 films
2000s English-language films
2005 Western (genre) films
Films set in the San Fernando Valley
Films directed by David Jacobson
American independent films
Neo-Western films
2005 independent films
American Western (genre) films
2005 drama films
2000s American films